Racism in the Dominican Republic exists due to the after-effects of African slavery and the subjugation of black people throughout history. In the Dominican Republic, "blackness" is often associated with Haitian migrants and a lower class status. Those who possess more African-like phenotypic features are often victims of discrimination, and are seen as foreigners. An envoy of the UN in October 2007 found that there was racism against black people in general, and particularly against Haitians, which proliferate in every segment of Dominican society.

The Dominican Republic has a right of blood law, which bases nationality on ancestral lineage rather than land of birth. The country has a large population of Haitian migrant descendants who are not seen as citizens, and are considered "stateless" by some human-rights organizations. A 2013 study concluded that Dominican Republic was the second most xenophobic country in the Americas.
 When individuals in the country were asked who they wouldn't want as neighbors, 15-20% responded those of "another race."

Socioeconomic status and racial hierarchy
The Dominican Republic, like most countries in Latin America that were colonized by Europeans, shows a strong correlation between race and wealth. The upper and upper-middle classes of the Dominican Republic are overwhelmingly of European origin. The middle class is the class with the broadest colour spectrum and is composed mostly of mixed race individuals of varying skintones, while the lower working-class is darker. The underclass is predominantly black, with many being of Haitian background.

People of predominant European ancestry in Dominican Republic have an economic and social privilege, and have strong representation in politics, business and the media, while those of African ancestry are in the lowest strata of society. Thus in the country whiteness is often associated with wealth, intelligence, beauty, and cleanliness, while blackness is associated with poverty, lower education, and unattractive features.

Racial classification in the Dominican Republic
Due to the influence of European colonization and the propagation of Africans or "darker people" as inferior, being of African ancestry is often not desired or acknowledged in the Dominican Republic. The mixed-race population identify as "Mestizo" or "Indio" rather than Mulatto, preferring to acknowledge only their European and Indigenous heritage, while those with darker skin and other traits associated with 'Blackness' face rejection and social exclusion. In Latin America, there is more flexibility in how people racially categorize themselves: they identify themselves mostly based on skin color and facial features and not so much their ancestry, allowing for more "racial fluidity." For example, a person who has some degree of Black ancestry can identify as non-Black if they can 'pass' as such. 

Socioeconomic status also heavily influence race classification in Latin America and tends to be correlated with whiteness. In the Dominican Republic, those of higher social status tend to be predominately of a lighter color tone as are often labeled as 'blanco/a', 'trigueño/a', or 'indio/a', while poorer people tend to be 'moreno/a', 'negro/a, or 'prieto/a', the latter category being heavily associated with Haitian migrants.

Discrimination against Haitians

An example of racism in the Dominican Republic and the prejudice against darker-skinned people is the relations between Haitian and Dominicans. The term “anti-Haitianism” has been coined to describe the discrimination against Haitians by Dominicans. The development of anti-Haitianism ideology can be attributed to the years of the Spanish racist mentality, racial stereotypes, and the historical propagation of dark-skinned people as the "inferior". Many Haitians have lost their lives as a result of this discrimination. The most notorious event that occurred was the massacres of Haitians in the Dominican Republic border region in 1937 under the order of former president, Rafael Trujillo. 

Approximately 10-20,000 men, women, children, babies and elderly, who were selected by their skin color, were massacred using machetes, guns or were thrown to sharks. While many of the people who lost their lives were Haitians who immigrated to the Dominican Republic, some were Haitians born in the Dominican Republic and those of Haitian-Dominican descent.

Trujillo's authoritarianism culminated in the 1937 massacre of Haitian peasants on the border with the Dominican Republic. Before the Haitian Massacre led by Trujillo, also known as the Parsley Massacre, President Lescot's had claimed Trujillo's motives behind his acts of violence towards Haitians in the Dominican border. Lescot's accusations of "material acts of violence and the continual violence of writings, practiced in the Dominican Republic against the Haitian People," challenge the idea of an economic, political, and military pan-American solidarity that the US government had promoted since the inauguration of the "Good Neighbor" policy in the early 1930s. The Good Neighbor policy was enacted by President Roosevelt in hopes of ensuring a mutual friendly relationship between the U.S and the nations of Latin America.

With Dominican civilians and local authorities participating in the massacre, many of them assisted the army by identifying and locating Haitians, while others helped Haitians hide and flee. Generally civilians who were recruited by Trujillo were prisoners from other areas of the country or local residents already tied to the regime. Local Dominican civilians were compelled by the army to burn and bury the bodies of the victims, which played a role in the growth of Anti-Hatianism. The rise of the sugar-plantation economy in the early twentieth century, as US sugar firms in the Dominican Republic imported Haitian laborers, led to opposition by the Black sub-proletariat. Anti-Haitianism has continued to grow and diffuse during the last 60 years, as Haitian migrants to Dominican sugar zones and other areas—mostly far from the frontier regions—actually increased in number after the massacre. According to Richard Lee Turits, author of the Haitian Massacre review, these migrants have been subjected to extraordinary exploitation and continual human rights abuses.

Contemporary incidences of Dominican discrimination against individuals of Haitian descent included the mass deportation of Haitians under the premise of purifying the racial state of the Dominican Republic. Following the earthquake that impacted Haiti in 2010, two weeks after the earthquake, the Dominican Government revoked citizenship by birth from the Constitution, thereby affecting the more than 800,000 Haitians who resided in Dominican Republic at the time. As a result of the withdrawal, Dominicans of Haitian descent are denied the issuance of birth certificates at birth which is need to acquire the national ID card. Without a national ID card, these individuals are not allowed to get government documents such as passports and drivers licenses, and they are not allowed to vote or hold political presence in the country. This is a systematic way to prevent Dominicans of Haitian descent from naturalizing or integrating into the society, especially politically. Despite this lack of representation, Haitians represent a large section of labor in the Dominican Republic and are subjected to slavery-like work conditions on sugar plantation.

The Aftermath Of The Haitian Massacre 

In October 1937, Dominican dictator Rafael Leonidas Trujillo Molina commanded his army to kill all "Haitians" living in the Dominican Republic's northwestern frontier, which borders on Haiti certain parts of the Cibao region. Many targeted Haitians were mostly small farmers, many of whom had been born in the Dominican Republic (and thus were Dominican citizens according to the Dominican constitution) and some whose families resided in the Dominican Republic for generations. The racial dimension to Dominican anti-Haitianism is shown as Haitians have been identified in the Dominican Republic as "black" in contrast to Dominicans. In the pre-massacre period, the colonization period served and gave voice to the anti-Haitian nationalism that had originally molded the concept of anti-hatianism.

References

Dominican Republic
Dominican Republic culture